Enoque Vicente Paes (born 11 December 1982), known as Paes, is a Brazilian footballer who plays as a goalkeeper.

Career statistics

References

External links

1982 births
Living people
Brazilian footballers
Brazilian expatriate footballers
Association football goalkeepers
Campeonato Brasileiro Série A players
Campeonato Brasileiro Série B players
Oeste Futebol Clube players
Brasiliense Futebol Clube players
Ceilândia Esporte Clube players
Associação Botafogo Futebol Clube players
Clube Atlético Tubarão players
Avaí FC players
S.C. Beira-Mar players
Cianorte Futebol Clube players
Associação Desportiva São Caetano players
Clube Atlético Penapolense players
Esporte Clube Água Santa players
Associação Portuguesa de Desportos players
Footballers from Rio de Janeiro (city)
Brazilian expatriate sportspeople in Portugal
Expatriate footballers in Portugal